The Broken Melody is a 1919 American silent drama film directed by William P.S. Earle and starring Eugene O'Brien, Lucy Cotton and Corinne Barker.

Cast
 Eugene O'Brien as 	Stewart Grant
 Lucy Cotton as 	Hedda Dana
 Corinne Barker as 	Mrs. Drexel Trask
 Donald Hall as 	Howard Thornby
 Ivo Dawson as 	Leroy Clemons
 Gus Weinberg as 	Ivan

References

Bibliography
 Connelly, Robert B. The Silents: Silent Feature Films, 1910-36, Volume 40, Issue 2. December Press, 1998.
 Munden, Kenneth White. The American Film Institute Catalog of Motion Pictures Produced in the United States, Part 1. University of California Press, 1997.

External links
 

1919 films
1919 drama films
1910s English-language films
American silent feature films
Silent American drama films
American black-and-white films
Films directed by William P. S. Earle
Selznick Pictures films
1910s American films